Three ships of the United States Navy have been named Aries:

, scrapped in 1908

Sources

United States Navy ship names